Tshivhumbe is a place where the Tshivhumbe tribe resides. The origin of the name comes from their surname Netshivhumbe. In Tshivenda the surname with "Ne" in the beginning indicates that those people are the owner of the place, whereas the word "Ne" shows the belonging.

Bantu-language surnames
Geography of South Africa
Venda
Places